Jana Šramková (born 3 January 1976, Brno, Czechoslovakia) is a retired Czech rhythmic gymnast. She competed for Czechoslovakia in the rhythmic gymnastics all-around competition at the 1992 Olympic Games in Barcelona. She was 13th in the qualification and advanced to the final, placing 16th overall.

References

External links 
 Jana Šramková at Sports-Reference.com

1976 births
Living people
Czechoslovak rhythmic gymnasts
Gymnasts at the 1992 Summer Olympics
Olympic gymnasts of Czechoslovakia
Sportspeople from Brno